Chè is any traditional Vietnamese sweet beverage, dessert soup or stew, or pudding. Chè includes a wide variety of distinct soups or puddings. Varieties of Chè can be made with mung beans, black-eyed peas, kidney beans, tapioca, jelly (clear or grass), fruit (longan, mango, durian, lychee or jackfruit), and coconut cream. Other types are made with ingredients such as salt, aloe vera, seaweed, lotus seed, sesame seed, sugar palm seeds, taro, cassava and pandan leaf extract. Some varieties, such as chè trôi nước, may also include dumplings. Chè are often prepared with one of a number of varieties of beans, tubers, and/or glutinous rice, cooked in water and sweetened with sugar. In southern Vietnam, chè are often garnished with coconut creme. 

Chè may be served either hot or cold, and eaten with a bowl and spoon or drunk in a glass. Each variety of chè is designated by a descriptive word or phrase that follows the word chè, such as chè đậu đỏ (literally "red bean chè").

Chè may be made at home, but are also commonly sold in plastic cups at Vietnamese grocery stores.

In northern Vietnam, chè is also the word for the tea plant.  Tea is also known as nước chè in the North or more commonly trà in both regions.

The Chinese category of sweet soups called tong sui are very similar to chè.

Varieties
There is a nearly endless variety of named dishes with the prefix chè, and thus it is impossible to produce a complete list. What follows is a list of the most typical traditional varieties of chè.

Beans and pulses
Chè ba màu - usually including green mung beans, white black-eyed peas, and red azuki beans, although people can cook with any ingredients making any three colours they like (compare with halo halo).
Chè đậu đen - made from black turtle beans; one of the most popular varieties of chè, particularly for northern Vietnamese
Chè đậu đỏ - made from azuki beans, usually using whole beans, rarely using ground beans.
Chè đậu huyết - made from red beans.
Chè đậu ngự - made from Phaseolus lunatus (or moon beans) - specialty in Huế, an imperial dish
Chè đậu phụng (also called chè đậu phộng in southern Vietnam, or chè lạc in northern Vietnam) - made from peanuts
Chè đậu trắng - made from black-eyed peas. Oftentimes, this dessert is just referred to as chè đậu as it is one of the most common bean dessert for southern Vietnamese.
Chè đậu ván Huế - made from Dolichos lablab (hyacinth beans); a specialty in Huế
Chè đậu xanh - made from whole mung beans
Chè đậu xanh phổ tai - made from mung beans and phổ tai (a kind of kelp)
Chè đậu xanh đánh - made from ground mung beans
Chè đậu đãi - made from ground skinless mung beans (đãi means to remove the skin)
Chè đậu xanh nha đam - mung beans and pieces of fresh aloe vera 
Chè hoa cau - a northern dish made from ground skinless mung beans with betel nut flower-shape (a similar dish called chè táo xọn, prepared in southern Vietnam, uses less mung beans)

Rice, grains, tubers and cereals
Chè bánh lọt - made from bánh lọt - a cake from Huế (lọt means "to sift").
Chè bắp (the Southern dialect) or chè ngô (the Northern dialect) - made from corn and tapioca rice pudding
Chè bột sắn (or chè sắn bột) - made from cassava flour
Chè sắn lắt - made from sliced cassava
Chè cốm - made from young rice.
Chè lam - made from ground glutinous rice
Chè củ mài - made from Dioscorea persimilis
Chè củ súng - made from water lily bulbs
Chè củ từ (or chè khoai từ) - made from Dioscorea esculenta
Chè hột lựu (called by this name in southern Vietnam and by chè hạt lựu in northern Vietnam) - in this dish, rice paste are cut into pomegranate seed-shaped pieces.
Chè hột é - basil seed drink  
Chè khoai lang - made from sweet potato
Chè khoai môn - made from taro
Chè môn sáp vàng - made from a variety of taro grown in Huế
Chè kê - made from millet
Chè khoai tây - made from potato
Chè mè đen - made from black sesame seeds
Chè sen - made from thin vermicelli and jasmine flavoured syrup 
Chè hạt sen - made from lotus seeds
Chè sen trần
Chè sen dừa - made from lotus seeds and coconut water
Chè củ sen - made from lotus tubers
Chè mã thầy (or chè củ năng) - made from water chestnuts
Cơm rượu - mildly alcoholic chè.

Jellies
Chè thạch or chè rau câu - made from agar agar
Chè thạch lựu - made from seaweed and other pomegranate seed-shaped tapioca pearls.
Chè thạch sen - made from seaweed and lotus seeds
Sương sâm - jelly with Tiliacora triandra extract
Sương sáo - Grass jelly
Chè thạch sen - thin, vermicelli-like jellies.

Dumplings
Chè bột lọc from small cassava and rice flour dumplings
Chè con ong (so named because this dish is viscous and yellow, like honey) - made from glutinous rice, ginger root, honey, and molasses– this is a northern dish, usually cooked to offer to the ancestors at Tết.
Chè bánh xếp - green bean wrapped in a tapioca skin dumpling eaten in a coconut milk base with smaller pieces of tapioca. Translated to English, the dish is "folded cake dessert".
Chè trôi nước - balls made from mung bean paste in a shell made of glutinous rice flour; served in a thick clear or brown liquid made of water, sugar, and grated ginger root.

Fruits and plants
Chè hoa quả (northern dialect) or chè trái cây (southern dialect) - mixture of different fruits including pineapple, watermelon, apple, pear, mango, lychee, dried banana, cherry, and dried coconut with milk, yogurt, and syrup
Chè nhãn - made from longan

Chè xoài - made from mango
Chè trái vải - lychee and jelly
Chè bưởi - made from pomelo oil and slivered rind
Chè chuối - made from bananas and tapioca (Vietnamese: bột báng). Traditionally served warm.
Chè sầu riêng - made from durian
Chè thốt nốt - made from sugar palm seeds
Chè mít - made from jackfruit
Chè lô hội - made from Aloe vera
Hột é - made from Sterculia lychnophora extract and basil seeds

Mixed
Chè đậu đỏ bánh lọt - red beans and bánh lọt.
Chè thập cẩm (chè lẫn) meaning ten-ingredient sweet soup or mixed sweet soup is a mixture of various kinds of ingredients such as black-eyed peas, azuki beans, lotus seeds, mung beans, coconut, syrup, ice cream, milk and trân châu. This is one of the most popular forms of chè served in Vietnam.
Chè bà ba - made from taro, cassava and khoai lang bí, a kind of sweet potato that is long, with red skin and yellow flesh.
Chè bà cốt - made from expanded glutinous rice
Chè bách niên hảo hợp – made from red beans, lotus seed, water lily bulb, and others  
Sâm bổ lượng - cold, sweet soup containing Coix lacryma-jobi var. ma-yuen, dried longans, red jujubes, lotus seeds, thinly sliced seaweed, and sometimes other ingredients, with water, sugar, and crushed ice
Chè thưng - name translates to combo dessert in Vietnamese. One version is made from dried red jujube, peanut, and dried Auricularia auricula-judae fungus, while another is made from taro, cassava, green bean, sea weed, and water chestnuts

Savory chè (chè mặn) 
Chè lạp xường or chè lạp xưởng - made from Chinese sausage
Chè thịt quay - made from roast pork
Chè trứng đỏ - made from eggs and other ingredients
Chè trứng - served with boiled eggs, either hot or cold, in a sweet soup base or sweet tea

Foreign chè
Bubur Cha cha or Bocha - a Vietnamese interpretation of a popular sweet soup originating from Malaysia and Singapore, found in Hanoi.
Chè Thái - a sweet fruit soup, which is believed to be a version of Thailand's tub tim krob, but the Vietnamese version uses a variety of tropical fruits, while the Thai version uses strictly chestnuts.
Tàu hũ or Tào phớ - Douhua chè.

See also

Vietnamese cuisine
Cendol
Halo halo
Boba tea

References 

Vietnamese soups
Cold soups
Puddings
Vietnamese desserts
Vietnamese words and phrases